Erickson is an unincorporated community immediately to the east of Creston, British Columbia. It is home to many cherry and apple orchards and is located on Highway 3, also known as the Crowsnest Highway.

Erickson has one school, Erickson Elementary School, which is in the School District # 8 and has grades Kindergarten through Grade 7. Erickson has two wineries, three hotels, one gas station, a micro grocery, and a sawmill. There are also over 10 fruit stands scattered along the two main roads. (Highway 3 & Erickson Rd) 

In 1926 the East Creston Irrigation District was established and, for the first time, Erickson had fresh running water from Arrow Creek.

References

East Kootenay
Unincorporated settlements in British Columbia